Young Fugitives is a 1938 American crime film directed by John Rawlins and written by Ben Grauman Kohn and Charles Grayson. The film stars Robert Wilcox, Dorothea Kent, Harry Davenport, Larry J. Blake, Clem Bevans and Mira McKinney. The film was released on June 30, 1938, by Universal Pictures.

Plot
Joel Bentham is given 50,000 dollars for being the last surviving civil war veteran in his part of the country, he decides to give a house to homeless woman Meg and takes in the grandson of a war comrade Ray Riggins. Ray, along with some criminal friends, is planning to rob Joel, but has a change of heart.

Cast        
Robert Wilcox as Ray Riggins
Dorothea Kent as Meg
Harry Davenport as Joel Bentham
Larry J. Blake as Silent Sam 
Clem Bevans as Benjie Collins
Mira McKinney as Letty
Henry Roquemore as Mayor Henry Scudder
Tom Ricketts as Tom Riggins
Mary Treen as Kathy
William "Billy" Benedict as Jud

References

External links
 

1938 films
1930s English-language films
American crime films
1938 crime films
Universal Pictures films
Films directed by John Rawlins
American black-and-white films
1930s American films